Ethiopian Jews in Israel are immigrants and descendants of the immigrants from the Beta Israel communities in Ethiopia who now reside in Israel. To a lesser, but notable, extent, the Ethiopian Jewish community in Israel is also composed of Falash Mura, a community of Beta Israel which had converted to Christianity over the course of the past two centuries, but were permitted to immigrate to Israel upon returning to Israelite religion - this time largely to Rabbinic Judaism.

Most of the community made aliyah from Ethiopia to Israel in two waves of mass immigration assisted by the Israeli government: Operation Moses (1984), and Operation Solomon (1991). Today, Israel is home to the largest Beta Israel community in the world, with about 160,500 citizens of Ethiopian descent in 2021, who are mainly assembled in the smaller urban areas of central Israel.

History

First wave (1934–1960)
The first Ethiopian Jews who settled in Israel in the modern times came in 1934 along with the Yemenite Jews from Italian Eritrea.

Second wave: (1961–1975)

Between the years 1963 and 1975, a relatively small group of Beta Israel emigrated to Israel. The Beta Israel immigrants during that period were mainly men who had studied and come to Israel on a tourist visa, and then remained in the country illegally.

Several of their supporters in Israel, who recognized their "Jewishness", decided to assist them. These supporters began organizing in associations, among others under the direction of Ovadia Hazzi, an Eritrean-born Yemeni Jew who married a Beta Israel woman in Israel. With the assistance of these support associations, a number of illegal immigrants managed to get their status regularized by the Israeli authorities. Some agreed to convert to Judaism, so as to be able to remain in Israel. People who obtained regularization often brought their families to Israel as well.

In 1973, Ovadia Hazzi officially raised the question of the "Jewishness" of the Beta Israel with Israel's Sephardi Chief Rabbi Ovadia Yosef. The rabbi, citing a rabbinic ruling from the 16th century David ben Solomon ibn Abi Zimra, asserted that the Beta Israel were descendants of the lost tribe of Dan, and eventually acknowledged their "Jewishness" in February 1973. This ruling was initially rejected by the Ashkenazi Chief Rabbi Shlomo Goren, who eventually changed his opinion on the matter in 1974.

In April 1975, the Israeli government of Yitzhak Rabin officially accepted the Beta Israel as Jews for the purpose of the Law of Return (an Israeli act which grants all the Jews in the world the right to immigrate to Israel).

Later on, Israeli Prime Minister Menachem Begin obtained clear rulings from Chief Sephardi Rabbi Ovadia Yosef that they were descendants of the Ten Lost Tribes. The Chief Rabbinate of Israel did, however, initially require them to undergo pro forma Jewish conversions, to remove any doubt as to their Jewish status.

Third wave: (1975–1990)

Operation Brothers

 November 1979 – 1983: Aliyah activists and Mossad agents operating in Sudan, including Ferede Aklum, called the Beta Israel to come to Sudan where they would eventually be taken to Israel via Europe. Jewish Ethiopian refugees from the Ethiopian Civil War in the mid 1970s began to arrive at the refugee camps in Sudan. Most Beta Israel came from Tigray, which was then controlled by the TPLF, which often escorted them to the Sudanese border. Many Ethiopian Jews also immigrated to Israel to flee from the civil war, famine during and after the war, as well as hostility toward Ethiopian Jews. In 1981, the Jewish Defense League protested against the "lack of action" to rescue Ethiopian Jews by taking over the main offices of HIAS in Manhattan.
 1983 – March 28, 1985: this emigration wave was in part motivated by word of mouth reports on the success of the emigration of many Jewish refugees to Israel. In 1983, the governor of Gondar region, Major Melaku Teferra, was ousted as governor and his successor removed restrictions on travel. Beta Israel began to arrive in large numbers and the Mossad was unable to evacuate them in time. Due to poor conditions in the camps, many refugees died of disease and hunger. Of these victims, it is estimated that between 2,000 and 5,000 were Beta Israel. In late 1984, the Sudanese government, following the intervention of the United States, allowed the emigration of 7,200 Beta Israel refugees to Europe. They immediately flew from there to Israel. The first of two operations during this period was Operation Moses (original name: "The Lion of Judah's Cub"), which took place between November 20, 1984 and January 20, 1985, during which time 6,500 people emigrated to Israel. A few weeks later, the U.S. Air Force evacuated the 494 Beta Israel refugees remaining in Sudan to Israel in Operation Joshua. The second operation was mainly carried out due to the intervention and international pressure of the United States.

Fourth wave (1990–1999)

 1991 (Operation Solomon): In 1991, the political and economic stability of Ethiopia deteriorated as rebels mounted attacks against, and eventually controlled, the capital city of Addis Ababa. Worried about the fate of the Beta Israel during the transition period, the Israeli government, together with several private groups, secretly prepared to continue with the migration. Over the course of the next 36 hours, a total of 34 El Al passenger planes, with their seats removed to maximize passenger capacity, flew 14,325 Beta Israel directly to Israel. Again, the operation was mainly carried out due to the intervention and international pressure of the U.S. Dr. Rick Hodes, an American doctor who emigrated to Ethiopia, was the medical director for Operation Solomon. It was a difficult two days as he covertly arranged for a number of very ill people to be air-lifted to Israel.
 1992–1999: During these years, the Qwara Beta Israel emigrated to Israel.

Falash Mura (1993–present)
 1993–present: From 1993 onwards, an irregular emigration began of Falash Mura, which was and still is mainly subjected to political developments in Israel. These immigrants are required to convert from Christianity to Judaism.

2018: In August 2018, the Netanyahu government vowed to bring in 1,000 Falasha Jews from Ethiopia. 
2019: In April 2019 an estimated 8,000 Falasha were waiting to leave Ethiopia
2020: On February 25, 2020, 43 Falasha arrived in Israel from Ethiopia.
2021:On November 14, 2021 Falasha Jews in Israel stage a protest so their relatives left behind in Ethiopia can go to Israel. On November 29, 2021, the Israeli Government permitted 3,000 Falasha Jews to go to Israel.
2022:On February 2, 2022, the Israeli "Supreme Court issues interim order halting Aliyah from Ethiopia". On March 15, 2022, Israel's High Court of Justice decided to remove an interim order which had halted the immigration of Ethiopian Jews to Israel.

Absorption in Israel

Ethiopian Beta Israel are gradually becoming part of the mainstream Israeli society in religious life, military service (with nearly all males doing national service), education, and politics. Similarly to other groups of immigrant Jews, who made aliyah to Israel, the Ethiopian Beta Israel have faced obstacles in their integration to Israeli society. The Ethiopian Beta Israel community's internal challenges have been complicated by: entering a relatively modern country (Israel) from non-modern, rural, remote regions of Ethiopia (compared with other immigrant groups entering from industrialized countries, and who typically possess significantly greater formal education); the disruption of long-standing hierarchies and customs within Beta Israel in which elders lead and guide their community; some racial prejudice, echoing racism that has existed in neighboring Middle Eastern countries and in Western countries; and a degree of lingering doubt within a minority of groups regarding the "Jewishness" of certain Ethiopians (e. g., the Falash Mura). However, with successive generations, Ethiopian Israelis have climbed in Israeli society.

Individual Ethiopian Beta Israel had lived in Eretz Yisrael prior to the establishment of the state. A youth group arrived in Israel in the 1950s to undergo training in Hebrew education, and returned to Ethiopia to educate young Beta Israeli community members there. Also, Ethiopian Beta Israel had been trickling into Israel prior to the 1970s. The numbers of such Ethiopian immigrants grew after the Israeli government officially recognized them in 1973 as Jews, entitled to Israeli citizenship.

To prepare for the absorption of tens of thousands of Ethiopian Beta Israel, the State of Israel prepared two "Master Plans" (Ministry of Absorption, 1985, 1991). The first was prepared in 1985, a year after the arrival of the first wave of immigrants. The second updated the first in response to the second wave of immigration in 1991 from Ethiopia. The first Master Plan contained an elaborate and detailed program. It covered issues of housing, education, employment, and practical organization, together with policy guidelines regarding specific groups, including women, youths, and single-parent families. Like earlier absorption policies, it adopted a procedural approach which assumed that the immigrants were broadly similar to the existing majority population of Israel. The Plans were created with a firm belief in assimilation. As noted in this section, results have been disappointing, and suggest that much greater attention needs to be paid to issues of ethnicity.

According to a 1999 BBC article, a report commissioned by Israel's Ministry of Immigrant Absorption stated that 75% of the 70,000 Ethiopian Beta Israel community, living in Israel in 1999 could not read or write Hebrew. More than half the population could not hold a simple conversation in the Hebrew language. Unlike Russian immigrants, many of whom arrived with job skills, Ethiopians came from a subsistence economy and were ill-prepared to work in an industrialized society. Since then, much progress has been made. Through military service, most Ethiopian Beta Israel have been able to increase their chances for better opportunities. Today, most Ethiopian Beta Israel have been for the most part integrated into Israeli society; however, a high drop-out rate is a problem, although a higher number are now edging towards the higher areas of society.

In September 2006, the Israeli government's proposed 2007 budget included reducing Ethiopian immigration from 600 persons per month to 150. On the eve of the Knesset vote, the Prime Minister's office announced that the plan had been dropped. Advocates for the Falash Mura noted that although the quota was set at 600 per month in March 2005, actual immigration has remained at 300 per month.

The first contact with Israel generally led to a culture shock amongst many of the new immigrants. Many of the Beta Israel immigrants, especially those who came from remote villages in Ethiopia, had never used electricity, elevators, flush toilets, or televisions. In addition, the adaptation to the Israeli cuisine was difficult.

The break-up of many of the close and extended families after being brought to the various integration centers in Israel, as well as the initial integration with the Israeli society was very difficult for many of the new immigrants. Name-changing also caused a symbolic break with the new immigrants' past. The Israeli authorities originally gave many of the new immigrants Hebrew given names, Hebrew names, and required them all to have family names, which did not exist in the Ethiopian society. These name-changes created a two-tier system, in which old and new names were used by the new immigrants. The immersion with the Hebrew language was not easy for the new immigrants, and the majority of the new immigrants never managed to master the language, even after living many years in Israel, resulting in a strong social marginalization. Finally, the questioning of their traditional religious practices by the Chief Rabbinate of Israel led to great confusion amongst the new immigrants.

Shas's spiritual mentor, Rabbi Ovadia Yosef, enthusiastically embraced Ethiopians when they first began immigrating to Israel. Despite Rabbi Ovadia's halachic ruling, some refuse to marry Ethiopians without a conversion in accordance with official Chief Rabbinate policy. Only in cities and towns with rabbis that accept Ovadia's ruling or the ruling of Rabbi Shlomo Goren are Ethiopians married without immersion in a ritual bath (mikva), or, for men, hatafat dam, הטפת דם (see brit milah), the symbolic cut to produce a drop of blood, instead of circumcision. There was also a great debate on the status of tattoos and their place in Judaism. In Jewish law (halacha), it is forbidden to permanently alter the body, including the skin. In modern forms, this puts a ban on tattoos. In Ethiopia, however, many of the women have tattoos that cover their arms, neck, hands, and face. The Beta Israel claim that these tattoos are for medicinal purposes, to help communicate and heal from an invasion of the zar (invisible spirits who are believed to be the heart of ailments and misfortune). When the majority of Ethiopian Jews were airlifted to Israel, many rabbis debated on the status of their jewishness because of this violation of Jewish law.

Religious leadership
Sixty Kessim (priests) of the Ethiopian immigrants in Israel are employed by the Ministry of Religious Services, and many of them conduct religious ceremonies in Israel. They are, however, not recognized as rabbis, and do not have the authority to perform marriages. Nevertheless, a new generation of Orthodox rabbis of Ethiopian origin trained in Israel are gradually taking over.

Socio-economic status
The biggest challenge to the Israeli Ethiopian Beta Israel community probably lies in the very low level of formal education of the immigrants. With few exceptions, when they first arrived in Israel, they had no useful training for a developed economy like that of Israel, and in addition, they did not know Hebrew. Due to the oral nature of rural living in Ethiopia, illiteracy was very common (according to one estimate, 90% among adults aged 37 and above), although young people were better educated, and a minority group amongst the Beta Israel immigrants did attend secondary schools in Ethiopia. Regarding the recent immigration of Falash Mura, NGOs (such as the North American Conference on Ethiopian Jewry) have attempted to provide those who have been waiting for years in Ethiopia for their immigration basic useful training for immigrants in Israel, as well as basic common concepts in Hebrew. Nevertheless, it is estimated that circa 80% of adult Felesmura become unemployed in Israel.

Due to the lack of work qualifications, high unemployment is widespread: In 2005, the unemployment rate was 65% amongst those over the age of 45. The younger generations, born or who have grown up in Israel, are more successful in being absorbed into Israeli economy, especially due to receiving modern education, but the average rate of educated people amongst the Beta Israel community is still smaller than that of the general Jewish youth, and this factor delays the emergence of a larger middle-class group of Ethiopian origin in the Israeli society. Despite this, in 2005, 3000 students graduated of higher education institutions, and 1,500 others graduated at the university. Nevertheless, even the academic graduates often experience trouble finding a job.

Low educational attainment, modest standards of living, and the occasionally isolated places of residence may explain the development of delinquency among the Beta Israel youth: In 2005, its rate was three times higher than the rate of the other Israeli youth.

A study published in 2012 found that members of the Beta Israel community earn 30%-40% less than Arab citizens of Israel, who are themselves considered as an under-privileged group. In order to reconcile this problem, many programs have been created to better the Ethiopian Jews in Israel's socio-economic status. One such program was Prof. Shalva Weil's program on excellence among Ethiopian Jews in Educational Leadership, run from the Hebrew University over time, women as well as men trained as leaders and informal educational leaders. Another program is Yvel's Megemeria School. Started in 2012, with the help of Yedid, the established pearl jewelry designer based in Jerusalem decided to open up a school to teach a class of Ethiopian students the tricks of the trade, as well as help them with Hebrew and English language courses and provide them with valuable personal finance lessons. Upon the completion of the program, the graduates are placed in jobs within the Israeli jewelry industry. This program has been so successful that it receives hundreds of applicants every year, although it only has space for 21 students per class.

Involvement in politics
The Atid Ehad party sees itself as the political representative of the community, though other parties include Ethiopian members. In 2006, Shas, a party representing Haredi Jews of Sephardic and Middle Eastern background, included an Ethiopian rabbi from Beersheba in its list for the Knesset, in a conscious attempt to represent diverse geographic and ethnic groups. Shas was not the only party attempting to appeal to the Ethiopian vote. Herut - The National Movement and Kadima both had Ethiopians on their lists. Shlomo Mula, head of the Jewish Agency's Ethiopian absorption department, was ranked 33 on Kadima's list, and Avraham was number three on Herut's list.

In 2012, Israel appointed the country's first Ethiopian-born ambassador, Beylanesh Zevadia. According to the foreign minister of Israel, this represents an important milestone in fighting racism and prejudice. This was followed in 2020 by the appointment of Pnina Tamano-Shata to the post of Minister of Aliyah and Integration in the 35th Israeli government, as the first Ethiopian-born government minister.

Language
The main language used for communication among Israeli citizens and amongst the Ethiopian Beta Israel in Israel is Modern Hebrew. The majority of the Beta Israel immigrants continue to speak in Amharic (primarily) and Tigrinya at home with their family members and friends. The Amharic language and the Tigrinya language are written in the Ge'ez script, originally developed for the Ge'ez language used in Ethiopian Orthodox Tewahedo Church.

Historically, Ethiopian Jews had spoken Agaw languages such as Qwara (nearly extinct) and Kayla (extinct).

Relations with Ethiopia
Although some non-Jewish Ethiopians expressed bitterness towards the Beta Israel emigration out of Ethiopia, the Ethiopian Jews have close ties with Ethiopian people and tradition. Achievements by the Ethiopian Jews like Hagit Yaso winning the Kokhav Nolad creates a sense of pride in Ethiopia. The Ethiopian government is also an important ally of Israel on the international stage. Israel often sends expert assistance for development projects in Ethiopia. Strategically, Israel "has always aspired to protect itself by means of a non-Arab belt that has included at various times Iran, Turkey, and Ethiopia".

Demography
The following is a list of the 60 most significant Beta Israel population centers in Israel, as of 2006:

The City of Kiryat Malakhi has a large concentration of Ethiopian Beta Israel, with 17.3% of the town’s population being members of the Beta Israel.

Controversy

Discrimination claims 
Controversy regarding the treatment of Ethiopian Jews began as early as the 1980s. Early that decade, the Israeli Chief Rabbinate put a policy in place that required immigrants to go through a ritual conversion ceremony, accept Rabbinic law, and - for males - be re-circumcised, with the stated goal of facilitating their assimilation to Jewish culture in Israel. By 1984, Ethiopian Jews opposed this policy, which they argued disregarded their religious practices as Jews. Many immigrants began to refuse to undergo conversion ceremonies and re-circumcision. In early 1985, the Chief Rabbinate changed the policy so that only Ethiopian Jews who wanted to marry as Jews in Israel would have to undergo the process. However, the Ethiopians still opposed the policy, which no other immigrant group in Israel had to undergo, and launched a strike on September 4, 1985. The strike aimed to achieve recognition as Jews without formal conversion or circumcision. Strikers also demanded that Ethiopians who wanted to marry as Jews should be dealt with on a case-by-case basis, and with the involvement of Ethiopian elders. The Ethiopians set up their strike in Jerusalem, outside the office of the Chief Rabbinate. Located next to the Great Synagogue, this was a prime location because people walking to and from synagogue everyday could see the protest. Eventually, non-Ethiopian Israelis began to join the protest. The strike continued for a month, into Rosh Hashanah. Anxious for the strike to end before Yom Kippur, the Chief Rabbinate began to negotiate with the protesters. The protestors denied the compromises, and once Yom Kippur was over, the Chief Rabbinate stopped negotiating with the protestors. The protestors realized their demonstration was taking a step back, so in order to avoid humiliation they decided to accept a deal presented to them weeks prior to the end of the strike. The Ethiopian Jews and Israeli officials agreed that in order for Ethiopians to marry in Israel, they would need to apply with their local registrar. The registrar would take testimony from Ethiopian elders into account, and those who could prove Jewish lineage could get married without the conversion ceremony.
In May 2015, The Jewish Daily Forward described the Ethiopian Jewish community in Israel as one that has "long complained of discrimination, racism, and poverty". The absorption of Ethiopians in Israeli society represents an ambitious attempt to deny the significance of race. Israeli authorities, aware of the situation of most African diaspora communities in other Western countries, hosted programs to avoid setting in patterns of discrimination. The Ethiopian Beta Israel community's internal challenges have been complicated by perceived racist attitudes in some sectors of Israeli society and the establishment.

In 2004, racism was alleged regarding delays in admitting Ethiopian Beta Israel to Israel under the Law of return. However, the delay may be attributed to religious motivations rather than racism, since there was debate whether or not Beta Israel people were indeed Jewish.

In 2005, racism was alleged when the mayor of Or Yehuda refused to accept a large increase in Ethiopian immigrants due to fear of having the property of the town decrease in value or having an increase in crime.

In 2009, schoolchildren of Ethiopian ancestry were denied admission into three semi-private Haredi schools in Petah Tikva. An Israeli government official criticized the Petah Tikva Municipality and the schools. Shas spiritual leader Ovadia Yosef threatened to fire any school principal from Shas's school system who refused to receive Ethiopian students. The Israeli Education Ministry decided to pull funding from the Lamerhav, Da'at Mevinim, and Darkhei Noam schools, which refused to accept the students. Israeli Prime Minister Benjamin Netanyahu spoke out against the rejection of Ethiopian children, calling it "a moral terror attack".

Demonstrations in Israel have occurred protesting the alleged racism against Ethiopian immigrants.

Protests against police brutality

In April 2015, an Ethiopian soldier in the IDF was the victim of an unprovoked and allegedly racist attack by an Israeli policeman and the attack was caught on video. The soldier, Damas Pakedeh, was arrested and then released, after being accused of attacking the policeman. Pakadeh is an orphan who emigrated from Ethiopia with his siblings in 2008. He believes the incident was racially motivated, and that, if the video had not been taken, he would have been punished. Instead, the police officer and volunteer were suspended pending an investigation. Likud MK Avraham Neguise called on National Police Chief Yohanan Danino to prosecute the police officer and volunteer, saying they engaged in "a gross violation of the basic law of respecting others and their liberty by those who are supposed to protect us". The Jerusalem Post notes that in 2015, "there have been a series of reports in the Israeli press about alleged acts of police brutality against Ethiopian Israelis, with many in the community saying they are unfairly targeted and treated more harshly than other citizens".

The incident of police brutality with Pakedeh and alleged brutality of officials from Israel's Administration of Border Crossings, Population, and Immigration with Walla Bayach, an Israeli of Ethiopian descent, brought the Ethiopian community to protest. Hundreds of Ethiopians participated in protests the streets of Jerusalem on April 20, 2015, to decry what they view as "rampant racism" and violence in Israel directed at their community. Israel Police Commissioner Yohanan Danino met with representatives of the Israeli Ethiopian community that day following the recent violent incidents involving police officers and members of the community. When over a thousand people protested police brutality against Ethiopians and dark skinned Israelis, Prime Minister Benjamin Netanyahu announced: "I strongly condemn the beating of the Ethiopian IDF soldier, and those responsible will be held accountable." Following protests and demonstrations in Tel Aviv that resulted in violence, Netanyahu planned to meet with representatives of the Ethiopian community, including Pakado. Netanyahu said the meeting would include Danino and representatives of several ministries, including Immigrant Absorption. Danino already announced that the officer who beat Pakado had been fired.

Ethiopian Jews in Israel held a protest on 2 July 2019. The protest started after an off-duty officer killed a young Ethiopian man, named Solomon Teka, on Sunday night, 1 July 2019, in Kiryat Haim, Haifa, in northern Israel.

Blood donations

On January 24, 1996, Ma'ariv newspaper revealed a Magen David Adom policy that drew heavy criticism in Israel and worldwide. According to the policy, which was not brought to the attention of the Israeli Ministry of Health or donors, blood donations received from Ethiopian immigrants and their offspring were secretly disposed of. A later public inquiry traced this back to a misinterpretation of a 1984 instruction to mark blood donations from Ethiopian immigrants due to a relatively high prevalence of HBsAg, indicative of Hepatitis B infections, in blood samples taken from this population.

A few days after the expose, ten thousand Beta Israel demonstrated in front of the Office of the Prime Minister. The police force was surprised and unprepared for the violence that erupted, leading to policemen being injured by stones, sticks, and steel rods. The police repelled the demonstrators with rubber bullets, water cannons, and tear gas. 41 policemen and 20 demonstrators were injured, and 200 cars belonging to the employees of the Prime Minister's Office were damaged.

Tests conducted on 650 Ethiopian immigrants who immigrated to Israel in 1984–1990 and 5,200 Ethiopian immigrants who immigrated in 1990–1992 revealed no HIV carriers before July 1990. Nevertheless, among the 5,200 Ethiopian immigrants who immigrated during "Operation Solomon", there were 118 HIV carriers, who made up 2.3 percent of the test population.

The public outcry led to his dismissal of the CEO of MDA, and the establishment of a commission of inquiry headed by former Israeli president Yitzhak Navon. After several months, the committee published its conclusions, calling for a change in policy. The Committee did not find evidence of racism, although some researchers have contested this.

On November 6, 2006, hundreds of Ethiopians clashed with police when protesters attempted to block the entrance to Jerusalem in the wake of the Israeli Health Ministry's decision to continue the MDA policy of disposing of donations from high-risk groups.

To date, the MDA prohibits the use of blood donations from natives of sub-Saharan Africa, except South Africa, natives of Southeast Asia, natives of the Caribbean and natives of countries which have been widely affected by the AIDS epidemic, including donations from the natives of Ethiopia. Since 1991, all immigrants from Ethiopia undergo mandatory HIV screenings, regardless of their intention to donate blood.

Birth control
According to a TV program in 2012, female Ethiopian immigrants may have been given the Depo-Provera birth control drug without full explanation of its effects, although the Israeli health ministry has instructed all health maintenance organizations not to use the treatment unless patients understand the ramifications. Ethiopian Jewish women awaiting aliyah were given birth control while in transit camps. The drug has existed for around thirty years and about forty percent of women use this method of birth control in Ethiopia.

The practice was first reported in 2010 by Isha le'Isha (Hebrew: Woman to Woman), an Israeli women's rights organization. Hedva Eyal, the report's author, stated: "We believe it is a method of reducing the number of births in a community that is black and mostly poor." Haaretz criticized international coverage of the issue, alleging that many Ethiopian women's procreational rights had been violated through poor medical practice on immigrant communities, but dismissed ideas of state-sponsored sterilization as false as the effects of Depo-Provera last only for three months.

See also

 Ethiopia–Israel relations
 Ethiopian cuisine
 Aliyah from Ethiopia
 History of the Jews in Africa
 History of the Jews in Ethiopia
 Jewish Agency for Israel
 Jewish ethnic divisions
 List of Israeli Ethiopian Jews
 The Red Sea Diving Resort

References

External links

 Beta Israel: Society and Culture – Ethiopian Jews
 Ethio-struggle
 Yopi – The Ethiopian Portal
 Israel Association for Ethiopian Jews

Israeli Jews by national origin
 
Habesha peoples
 
Israel
Society of Israel
Jewish Ethiopian history
Jewish Agency for Israel